Zulu Man with Some Power is the third studio album by South African rapper Nasty C. It was released by Def Jam Recordings and Universal Music Group on August 28, 2020. The album features several American artists, Ari Lennox, T.I., Lil Keed and Lil Gotit.

Accolades

Release 
On August 28, 2020, Nasty C released his third studio album Zulu Man with Some Power is about fifth eight minutes and thirty one seconds consisting of 20 tracks. The album was released under Def Jams Recordings and Universal Music South Africa.

The album was preceded by four singles. "There They Go", "Eazy", "Palm Trees" and "They Don't" features American rapper T.I.

Track listing 
Credits adapted from Genius, AllMusic & Apple Music

Sample Credit

 "Feeling" samples "Always" by Kota the Friend featuring Kyle

Critical reception

Personnel 
Credits are adapted  from AllMusic.

 Sipho Dlamini - Executive Producer, Producer
 Thulasizwe Dlamini - Composer
 Impala Drummerz - Producer
 Eliot Dubock - Composer
 Jacob Dutton - Composer
 Danny E.Beatz - Producer
 Ronnie Eriic - Composer
 Peter Michael Fernandes - Composer
 G Koop - Producer
 Colin Gayle - Executive Producer, Producer
 ATL Jacob - Producer
 Bankroll Got It - Producer
 Joel Banks - Composer
 Taylor Banks - Composer
 Tshepo C. Malatji - Composer
 Beat Butcha - Producer
 Blasian Beats - Producer
 Tantu Beats - Producer
 Beatsbydil - Producer
 Pluss - Producer
 Courtney Salters - Composer
 Spacedtime - Producer
 Jerren Spruill - Composer
 Troy Taylor - Composer, Vocal Producer
 Telleman - Vocal Producer
 Thandanani Makomborero Chehore -
Composer
 T.I. - Primary Artist, Rap, Vocal Producer, Vocals
 Dilan Llamas Urías - Composer
 Earl Washington - Engineer, Mixing Engineer
 Darrius Willrich - Composer, Producer
 Sam Wishkoski - Composer, Producer
 Rowlene - Composer, Primary Artist, Vocals
 Che Olson - Composer
 Nani - Producer
 Nsikayesizwe David Junior Ngcobo - Composer, Executive Producer, Producer
 Anthony Mundle - A&R
 Mike Manitshana - Assistant Mastering Engineer, Engineer, Mastering Engineer, Mixing, Mixing Engineer 
 Roy Lenzo - Engineer, Mixing Engineer
 Jacob Canady - Composer
 Gary Cheung - Composer
 Cxdy - Producer
 Zino D - Producer

References 

2020 albums
Nasty C albums
Def Jam Recordings albums